The Picoiquén River is a river in Malleco Province of southern Chile. It is a tributary of Rehue River, which with it meet at the city of Angol.

See also
List of rivers of Chile

References
 EVALUACION DE LOS RECURSOS HIDRICOS SUPERFICIALES EN LA CUENCA DEL RIO BIO BIO

Rivers of Chile
Rivers of Araucanía Region